Amy Nichole Grady (born October 15, 1979) is an American teacher and politician who has served as the junior West Virginia State Senator from the 4th district since 2020. Grady is a Republican. Grady has served as the chair of the West Virginia Senate Education Committee since 2022.

Early life, education, and career
Grady is the daughter of Addie Roberts. She received her Bachelor of Education degree from Marietta College and West Virginia University and served as a teacher before running for office.

Elections
Grady, a teacher, was inspired to run for office after participating in the 2018 West Virginia teachers' strike. Her later opponent in the primary, Lt. Governor and President of the West Virginia Senate, Mitch Carmichael, had opposed pay raises for teachers and supported charter schools. Her role in the strike led her to seek the office.

On her website, Grady described herself as a "Pro-life, Pro-2nd Amendment conservative teacher who is fed up with self-serving elected officials." Her campaign was self-funded and Carmichael outraised her by more than 50:1 in the primary.

Grady won the three-way primary election with 39.12% of the vote, defeating Carmichael by a margin of fewer than 1000 votes. Carmichael conceded the evening of the election and agreed to support Grady in the general.

Grady defeated Democrat Bruce Ashworth in the 2020 general election with 70.69% of the vote.

Tenure

Committee assignments

 Education (chair)
Health and Human Resources (Vice Chair)
Agriculture and Rural Development
Judiciary
Military
Natural Resources

Education
Grady spoke in support of and voted for House Bill 2013, a bill that would allow more public funds to be used by parents sending their children to private schools.

Grady voted for Senate Bill 680, a bill that would make it harder for school staff to be given raises.

Transgender rights
As a member of the education committee, Grady was the lead sponsor of Senate Bill 341, a bill that would require transgender athletes to compete in sports associated with their biological sex.

DC statehood
With many of her fellow Senators, Grady signed onto a resolution requesting West Virginia Senators and Congresspeople to oppose bills that would allow statehood for the District of Columbia.

Personal life
Grady is married to Jack L. Grady and has three children. She is a Christian.

References

1979 births
21st-century American politicians
Living people
Republican Party West Virginia state senators
Marietta College alumni